¡Qué clase de amor! (What Kind of Love!) is a 2009 Venezuelan juvenile telenovela produced by Venevisión and BCC Producciones in 2009. It stars Andrés Gómez and Aisha Stambouli as the main protagonists while Joan Manuel Larrad and Mayela Caldera star as the main antagonists. The telenovela premiered on Venevisión at the 6:00 pm timeslot.

Plot
The story is set in an urban high school filled with adolescents who experience joys, sorrows, love and triumphs.

"Los Populares" is the name given to the group consisting of the most popular and rebellious students in the school. Their leader, Diego Padilla, is a casanova who makes all the girls fall in love with him. His girlfriend, Stefanie Mendoza, is the prettiest and the most spoilt girl in the school. But fate has other plans for Diego, for he will find himself falling in love with Alejandra Martínez, a brilliant and clever nerd who is new to the school. Stephanie is the complete opposite of the type of girl that Diego would normally fall in love with.

Diego approaches Alejandra and her nerd friends referred to as "Las Nerdas" with the sole purpose of seeking their assistance with his studies. However, with time, Alejandra will slowly conquer Diego's heart, and not even Stephanie, with her beauty, popularity and charms can stop Alejandra's and Diego's love. Alán Camacho nicknamed "Alacrán" belongs to the group "Los Alacranes" which is composed of singers. For a long time, Alan has grown jealous of Diego's popularity, especially due to the fact that he is in love with Stephanie, though Stephanie rejected his love. Alan will set a trap for Alejandra to completely ruin Diego's image and reputation in the school.

Cast
 Aisha Stambouli as Alejandra Martínez
 Andrés Gómez as Diego Padilla
 Joan Manuel Larrad as Alán Camacho "Alacrán"
 Mayela Caldera as Stefani Mendoza
 Georgina Palacios as Martha Pérez
 Mark Colina as Marcel Jiménez "El Destripador"
 Miguel Ángel Tovar as Manuel Colmenares "Manu"
 Giannina Alves as Milagros Pérez "Tita"'
 Andrés Sosa as Rafael Gómez "Rafa"
 Rosanna Zanetti as Andreína Figueroa
 Vanessa Hidalgo as Desiré Sánchez
 Juan Miguel Henriques as Félix Rodríguez
 María Eugenia d'Angelo as Romina Casanova
 Jaime Suárez as Samy Rodríguez
 Joaquín Araujo as Germán
 Rafael Gabeiras as Sebastián
 Jesús Alberto Vieira as Román
 Dayana Oliveros as Karla
 Wendy Bermejo as Magaly
 Carolina Muizzi as Sasha
 Rodolfo Salas as Leonardo
 Jessica Semeco as Leila
 Cesar Augusto Méndez as Abraham
 Anavir García as Cristinita
 Cesar D' La Torre as Caiman

Special Guests
 Rosalinda Serfaty as la Directora Ana María Sosa
 Ruddy Rodríguez as Aurora
 Samir Bazzi as Profesor Narciso o "El Papi Profe"
 Yulika Krausz as Pura

Musical Themes

References

2009 telenovelas
Venevisión telenovelas
2009 Venezuelan television series debuts
Venezuelan telenovelas
2009 Venezuelan television series endings
Spanish-language telenovelas
Television series about teenagers
Television shows set in Venezuela